The Military Forces of Colombia are the unified armed forces of the Republic of Colombia. They consist of the Colombian Army, the Colombian Navy and the Colombian Air Force. The National Police of Colombia, although technically not part of the military, is controlled and administered by the Ministry of National Defence, and national conscription also includes service in the National Police, thus making it a de facto gendarmerie and a branch of the military. The President of Colombia is the military's commander in chief, and helps formulate defense policy through the Ministry of National Defence, which is in charge of day-to-day operations.

The Military Forces of Colombia have their roots in the Army of the Commoners, which was formed on 7 August 1819 – before the establishment of the present day Colombia – to meet the demands of the Revolutionary War against the Spanish Empire. After their triumph in the war, the Army of the Commoners disbanded, and the Congress of Angostura created the Gran Colombian Army to replace it, thus establishing the first military service branch of the country.

The Colombian military was operationally involved in World War II and was the only Latin American country to send troops to the Korean War. Ever since the advent of the Colombian Conflict, the Colombian military has been involved in combat, pacification, counter-insurgency, and drug interdiction operations all over the country's national territory. Recently it has participated in counter-piracy efforts in the Horn of Africa under Operation Ocean Shield and Operation Atlanta.

The military of Colombia is the third largest in the Western Hemisphere in terms of active personnel and has the fourth largest expenditure in the Americas, behind the United States Armed Forces, the Canadian Armed Forces and the Brazilian Armed Forces respectively.

Services
The Colombian Constitution includes two overlapping definitions of what could be defined as 'armed forces' in English:
 The Public Force: Includes the Military Forces proper and the National Police (Title VII, chapter VII, Art. 216)
 The Military Forces: Includes only the 3 major military service branches: Army, Navy and Air Force (Title VII, chapter VII, Art. 217)

This is a subtle yet important distinction, both in terms of emphasizing the civil nature of the National Police, but also adapting the national police to function as a paramilitary force which can perform military duties as a result of the Colombian Conflict. This has led to some of the most important police units adopting military training and conducting special operations alongside the Colombian Army, Air Force, and Navy. Therefore, the functions of the Colombian Police in practical terms are similar to those of a gendarmerie, like the Spanish Civil Guard and the Carabineros de Chile, which maintain military ranks for all police personnel.

Personnel

The Colombian armed forces consist of: 
Military Forces:
 Colombian Army
 Colombian Navy – and attached services Marines and Colombian Coast Guard
 Colombian Air Force
And, 
 National Police of Colombia

Public Force strength as of April 2014.

Dependencies
 Military Medical Corps ('') – Medical and Nurse Corps
 Indumil – Military Industry Depot
 Military Sports Federation
 Military Printing
 Military Museum – History of the Armed Forces of Colombia
 Superior War College (Escuela Superior de Guerra (Colombia) ESDEGUE)

Funding
In 2000, Colombia assigned 3.9% of its GDP to defense. By 2008 this figure had risen to 4.8%, ranking it 14th in the world. The armed forces number about 250,000 uniformed personnel: 145,000 military and 105,000 police. These figures do not include assistance personnel such as cooks, medics, mechanics, and so on. This makes the Colombian military one of the largest and most well-equipped in Latin America. Many Colombian military personnel have received military training assistance directly in Colombia and also in the United States. The United States has provided equipment and financing to the Colombian military and police through the military assistance program, foreign military sales, and the international narcotics control program, all currently united under the auspices of Plan Colombia.

World factbook statistics
Military manpower – military service age and obligation: 18 years of age for compulsory and voluntary military service; conscript service obligation – 24 months (2004)
Military manpower – availability:
males age 18–49: 10,212,456
females age 18–49: 10,561,562 (2005 estimate)
Military manpower – fit for military service:
males age 18–49: 6,986,228
females age 18–49: 8,794,465 (2005 estimate)
Military manpower – reaching military age annually:
males age 18–49: 389,735
females age 18–49: 383,146 (2005 estimate)

Rank Insignia

See also
 AFEUR
 Colombia
 Colombian Army
 Colombian military decorations
 Indumil
 Joint Task Force OMEGA
 Military ranks of the Colombian Armed Forces

References and notes
Includes 435 sub-officers  and 3,125 agents 
Includes 123,125 executive personnel  and 23,562 Auxiliary conscript

External links
 Ministerio de Defensa de Colombia – Official Ministry of Defense site 
 Comando General de las Fuerzas Militares – Official Armed Forces General Command 
 Ejército Nacional de Colombia – Official Army site 
 Ejército Nacional de Colombia – Official Army site 
 Armada Nacional de Colombia – Official Navy site
 Fuérza Aérea Colombiana – Official Air Force site 
 Policía Nacional de Colombia – Official National Police site 
 UNFFMM  – Unofficial site of the Colombian Military Forces

Other Links
 Colombian Military expenditure

Bibliography 

Military of Colombia
Ministry of National Defense (Colombia)

fr:Armée nationale colombienne